John MacDermott may refer to:

John MacDermott, Baron MacDermott (1896–1979), Northern Irish politician and lawyer
John MacDermott (judge) (1927–2022), Northern Irish barrister and judge
Seán Mac Diarmada (1883–1916), Irish rebel, leader in the 1916 Easter Rising in Ireland (born John MacDermott)

See also
John McDermott (disambiguation)